Tierra del Fuego Province is one of four provinces in the southern Chilean region of Magallanes and Antártica Chilena (XII). It includes the Chilean or western part of the main island of Tierra del Fuego, except for the part south of the Cordillera Darwin, which is in Antártica Chilena Province. (Argentina also has a Tierra del Fuego Province.)

Chilean Tierra del Fuego has two towns, Porvenir, capital of the province, and Cerro Sombrero, and a number of small villages. A key geographical feature is Bahía Inútil ("Useless Bay"), so named by British geographers in the late 19th century because the bay is not useful as a port.

Geology and hydrography
Gold-bearing sands have been recorded at a number of sites within the Fuegan shores of the Tierra del Fuego Province. Chilean Tierra del Fuego is known for numerous small lakes, including Lago Blanco and Lago Deseado. The climate is Subpolar Oceanic, bordering on a Tundra climate

Demography
It is the third most sparsely populated province in the country after Antártica Chilena and Capitan Prat, and it is the fifth least-populated province in the country. Of these, 4,734 (68.6%) lived in urban areas and 2,170 (31.4%) in rural areas. Between the 1992 and 2002 censuses, the population fell by 1.2% (81 persons).

History
The shores among the islands have provided settlement locations for thousands of years of early humans in the Americas. In particular, the Wulaia Bay area of Navarino Island (south of the province) has yielded evidence of settlement by the Yaghan people more than 10,000 years ago.

A goldrush occurred in the late 19th and early 20th century.

See also 
Tierra del Fuego Province, Argentina
Tierra del Fuego Archipielago
Isla Grande de Tierra del Fuego
Tierra del Fuego gold rush
1949 Tierra del Fuego earthquake
Porvenir, Chile
Magallanes and Antártica Chilena Region

References
 C. Michael Hogan (2008) "Bahia Wulaia Dome Middens", The Megalithic Portal, ed. Andy Burnham
 J. Rabassa (2008) The Late Cenozoic of Patagonia and Tierra Del Fuego'', Elsevier, 524 pages  

 
Provinces of Chile
Provinces of Magallanes Region